Thomas Degand (born 13 May 1986) is a Belgian racing cyclist, who most recently rode for UCI ProTeam .

He rode at the 2014 UCI Road World Championships, and was named in the start list for the 2015 Vuelta a España but he withdrew from the race after a crash. In June 2017, he was named in the startlist for the Tour de France.

Major results

2008
 3rd Grand Prix Criquielion
 4th Flèche Ardennaise
2009
 2nd Grand Prix Criquielion
 8th Flèche Ardennaise
 10th Paris–Mantes-en-Yvelines
2010
 1st Circuit de Wallonie
 1st Flèche Ardennaise
 7th Overall Rhône-Alpes Isère Tour
 7th Omloop Het Nieuwsblad Beloften
 9th Overall Ronde de l'Oise
2011
 3rd Overall Paris–Corrèze
 5th Overall Tour du Limousin
 5th Overall Tour of South Africa
 6th Overall Tour de Wallonie
 7th Overall Route du Sud
2014
 2nd Overall Tour du Gévaudan Languedoc-Roussillon
1st Stage 1
 6th Overall Tour Méditerranéen
 7th Overall Vuelta a Andalucía
 10th Overall Tour of Austria
2015
 8th Overall Tour of Austria
2017
 1st  Overall Tour du Jura
2018
 4th Volta Limburg Classic
 6th Overall Tour du Limousin
 9th Boucles de l'Aulne

Grand Tour general classification results timeline

References

External links

1986 births
Living people
Belgian male cyclists
Cyclists from East Flanders
People from Ronse